The Helmet is a breed of fancy pigeon developed over many years of selective breeding. Helmets, along with other varieties of domesticated pigeons, are all descendants from the rock pigeon (Columba livia). The breed has medium face, short face, plain-head and crested varieties. Helmet pigeons have been referenced since the early 15th century and appear to have origins in Germany. The modern varieties were refined in the latter 20th century.

See also 
List of pigeon breeds
Polish Helmet

References

Pigeon breeds